Robert Emmet Tracy (September 14, 1909—April 4, 1980) was an American prelate of the Roman Catholic Church who served as bishop of the Diocese of Baton Rouge in Louisiana from 1961 to 1974.  He previously served as an auxiliary bishop of the Diocese of Lafayette in Louisiana from 1959 to 1961.

Biography

Early life 
Robert Tracy was born in New Orleans, Louisiana, to Robert Emmet and Margaret Agnes (née Cahill) Tracy. He studied at Saint Joseph Seminary College and Notre Dame Seminary. 

Tracy was ordained to the priesthood for the Archdiocese of New Orleans on June 12, 1932, at age 22. He then served as a curate at St. Leo Parish in New Orleans (1932–1946) and archdiocesan director of the Confraternity of Christian Doctrine (1937–1946). He was chaplain of the Newman Centers at Tulane University in New Orleans (1941–1946) and at Louisiana State University in Baton Rouge, Louisiana (1946–1959). Tracy was named a papal chamberlain in 1947 and a domestic prelate in 1949. From 1954 to 1955, he was national chaplain of the Newman Club Federation.

Auxiliary Bishop of Lafayette 
On March 13, 1959, Tracy was appointed auxiliary bishop of the Diocese of Lafayette and Titular Bishop of Sergentza by Pope John XXIII. Tracy received his episcopal consecration on May 19, 1959, from Archbishop Egidio Vagnozzi, with Bishops Maurice Schexnayder and Louis Caillouet serving as co-consecrators.

Bishop of Baton Rouge 
Tracy was named the first bishop of the new Diocese of Baton Rouge on August 10, 1961 by John XXIII.  Tracy was installed on November 8, 1961.

From 1962 to 1965, Tracy attended the Second Vatican Council in Rome; on October 24, 1963, he addressed the Council in the name of his fellow American bishops on the subject of racial equality. In 1966, he published his memoir of the Council, entitled American Bishop at the Vatican Council. He established a consultative process as an integral part of the diocesan administration, and encouraged the greater participation of the laity in governing the Church. Tracy also oversaw the construction of the Catholic Life Center and the renovation of St. Joseph Cathedral in Baton Rouge.

In 1967, Tracy became the first American bishop to publish a financial statement for his diocese. In 1972, he established a committee for the regulation of allowing remarried Catholics to receive the sacraments, saying, "The Church has a pastoral responsibility of healing and forgiveness".

Retirement and legacy 
Pope Paul VI accepted Tracy's resignation as bishop of Baton Rouge on March 21, 1974, after twelve years of service. Robert Tracy died on April 4, 1980, at age 70.

References

External links

Episcopal succession

1909 births
1980 deaths
American Roman Catholic clergy of Irish descent
Notre Dame Seminary alumni
Participants in the Second Vatican Council
People from New Orleans
Roman Catholic Diocese of Baton Rouge
Saint Joseph Seminary College alumni
20th-century Roman Catholic bishops in the United States
Catholics from Louisiana